Members of the New South Wales Legislative Assembly  who served in the 28th parliament of New South Wales held their seats from 1927 to 1930. They were elected at the 1927 state election, and at by-elections. The Speaker was Sir Daniel Levy.

See also
Bavin ministry
Results of the 1927 New South Wales state election
Candidates of the 1927 New South Wales state election

References

Nairn, Bede (1995) Jack Lang the 'Big Fella': Jack Lang and the Australian Labor Party 1891–1949, Melbourne University Press, Melbourne. . 

Members of New South Wales parliaments by term
20th-century Australian politicians